Perquimans County Courthouse is a historic courthouse building located at Hertford, Perquimans County, North Carolina.  It was built between 1819 and 1825, and is a 2 1/2-story, four bay, Georgian style brick building.  It has a "T"-shaped plan, with late-19th and 20th century rear additions.  The front facade features a one-story, one-bay pedimented portico with molded brick columns.

It was added to the National Register of Historic Places in 1979.  It is located in the Hertford Historic District.

References

County courthouses in North Carolina
Courthouses on the National Register of Historic Places in North Carolina
Georgian architecture in North Carolina
Government buildings completed in 1825
Buildings and structures in Perquimans County, North Carolina
National Register of Historic Places in Perquimans County, North Carolina
Individually listed contributing properties to historic districts on the National Register in North Carolina